George Rolfe (1808–1871) was a merchant and politician in the Colony of Victoria.

George Rolfe may also refer to:

 George Rolfe (anatomist), professor of surgery (1707), see Professor of Anatomy, Cambridge University
 George Rolfe (director), first director of the Pike Place Market Preservation and Development Authority

See also
George Rolph (1794–1875), Canadian lawyer and politician
George Rolph (activist) (born 1953), British activist